Northern Ireland cricket clubs, by county, are as follows:

County Antrim
Academy Cricket Club, Hydepark
Ballymena Cricket Club
Belfast International Sports Club, Mallusk
Carrickfergus Cricket Club, Carrickfergus
Cliftonville Cricket Club, Mallusk
Cooke Collegians Cricket Club, Belfast
Cregagh Cricket Club, Belfast
Derriaghy Cricket Club, Derriaghy
Dunmurry Cricket Club
Larne Cricket Club, Larne
Lisburn Cricket Club, Lisburn
Muckamore Cricket Club, Antrim
P.S.N.I. Cricket Club, Belfast
Templepatrick Cricket Club, Ballyclare
Woodvale Cricket Club, Belfast

County Armagh
Armagh Cricket Club, Armagh
Laurelvale Cricket Club
Lurgan Cricket Club, Lurgan
Portadown Cricket Club
Victoria Cricket Club Lurgan

County Down
Ards Cricket Club, Newtownards
Bangor Cricket Club, Bangor
C.I.Y.M.S. Cricket Club, Belfast
Civil Service North of Ireland Cricket Club, Belfast
Cooke Collegians Cricket Club, Belfast
Donaghadee Cricket Club, Donaghadee
Donaghcloney Cricket Club
Downpatrick Cricket Club, Downpatrick
Drumaness Cricket Club, Drumaness
Dundrum Cricket Club, Dundrum
Holywood Cricket Club, Holywood
Instonians, Belfast
Millpark Cricket Club, Gilford
North Down Cricket Club, Comber
Saintfield Cricket Club, Saintfield
Waringstown Cricket Club, Waringstown

County Fermanagh
North Fermanagh Cricket Club

County Londonderry
Ardmore Cricket Club, Ardmore
Bonds Glen Cricket Club, Derry
Brigade Cricket Club, Derry
Coleraine Cricket Club, Coleraine
Creevedonnell Cricket Club, Derry
Drummond Cricket Club, Limavady
Eglinton Cricket Club, Eglinton
Glendermott Cricket Club, Derry
Limavady Cricket Club, Limavady
Maghera Cricket Club, Maghera
The Nedd Cricket Club, Ballykelly

County Tyrone
Bready Cricket Club, Bready
Burndennet Cricket Club
Clogher Cricket Club
Donemana Cricket Club, Donemana
Dungannon Cricket Club
Fox Lodge Cricket Club, Ballymagorry
Killyclooney Cricket Club
Sion Mills Cricket Club, Sion Mills
Strabane Cricket Club, Strabane

 
Cricket
Cricket clubs